Duke W. Dunbar (September 3, 1894 – December 8, 1972) was an American politician who served as the Attorney General of Colorado from 1951 to 1972.

He died of a stroke on December 8, 1972, in Denver, Colorado at age 78.

References

1894 births
1972 deaths
Colorado Attorneys General
Colorado Republicans